is a Japanese anime director. He debuted in 2009, and after doing the storyboards for three series, he was given the full directorial role in the anime adaptation of Your Lie in April. After directing other television series, he debuted as a film director with Words Bubble Up Like Soda Pop.

Biography
Kyōhei Ishiguro was born in Hadano, Kanagawa on April 2, 1980. After working for Sunrise, he made his directorial debut with the eighth episode of Fairy Tail. He also did storyboarding for Wandering Son, Saki Achiga-hen episode of Side-A, and My Little Monster. 

In 2013, Ishiguro married character designer Yukiko Aikei. In 2014, Ishiguro made his full directorial debut with the anime adaptation of Naoshi Arakawa's Your Lie in April., which won the 2016 Sugoi Japan Award in the anime category. Following Your Lie in Aprils success, Ishiguro directed the anime adaptation of Lance N' Masques. He also later directed the television series adaptations of Occultic;Nine and Children of the Whales.

In 2021, Ishiguro made his debut as a film director with Words Bubble Up Like Soda Pop. It was nominated for the Mainichi Film Award for Best Animation Film in the same year. He also directed the 2021 film Bright: Samurai Soul.

Works

TV series
 Fairy Tail (2009) (episode 8 director)
  (2011) (storyboards)
  (2012) (storyboards)
  (2012) (storyboards)
 Psycho-Pass (2012) (episode 9 director)
  (2014–2015) (director)
  (2015) (director)
  (2016) (director)
  (2017) (director)

Films
  (2021) (director)
 Bright: Samurai Soul (2021) (director)

References

External links
 

1980 births
Anime directors
Japanese film directors
Japanese storyboard artists
Japanese television directors
Living people
People from Hadano, Kanagawa